The 14041/42 Old Delhi Junction–Dehradun Mussoorie Express is an Express train belonging to Indian Railways – Northern Railways zone that runs between Old Delhi Junction and Dehradun, Uttarakhand.

It operates as train number 14041 from Old Delhi Junction to Dehradun and as train number 14042 in the reverse direction.

Coaches

The 14041/42 Delhi Junction-Deradun Mussoorie Express presently has 1 AC 1st Class, 1 AC 2 tier, 2 AC 3 tier, 8 Sleeper Class, 5 Second Class seating & 2 SLR (Seating cum Luggage Rake) coaches.

As with most train services in India, coach composition may be amended at the discretion of Indian Railways depending on demand.

In addition, slip coaches of the 24041/24042 Mussoorie Express are also attached to the train at Haridwar.

Service

The 14041/42 Delhi Junction–Dehradun Mussoorie Express covers the distance of 339 kilometres in 10 hours 40 mins as 14041 Delhi Junction–Dehradun Mussoorie Express (31.78 km/hr) & in 11 hrs 05 mins as 14042 Dehradun–Delhi Junction Mussoorie Express (30.59 km/hr).

As the average speed of the train is below , as per Indian Railways rules, its fare does not include a Superfast surcharge.

Routeing

The 14041/42 Delhi Junction–Dehradun Mussoorie Express runs via , Gajraula, Najibabad,  to Dehradun.

Traction

As the route is yet to be electrified, a WDM-3A or WDP-4B from Tughlakabad shed is the traditional powerhouse for the train. Occasionally a Lucknow based locomotive may be used for the train.

Time Table

14041 Delhi Junction–Dehradun Mussoorie Express leaves Delhi Junction on a daily basis at 22:25 hrs IST and reaches Dehradun at 08:10 hrs IST the next day.

14041 Delhi Junction–Dehradun Mussoorie Express leaves Dehradun on a daily basis at 21:25 hrs IST and reaches Delhi Junction at 08:30 hrs IST the next day.

External links

References 

 http://www.grahakseva.com/complaints/175810/unauthorised-passengers-causing-havoc-in-mussoorie-express-train

Trains from Dehradun
Transport in Delhi
Named passenger trains of India
Rail transport in Delhi
Express trains in India
Rail transport in Uttarakhand
Rail transport in Uttar Pradesh